Phạm Duy Khiêm (24 April 1908 – 2 December 1974) was a Vietnamese writer, academic and South Vietnam ambassador in France. He was the son of the writer Phạm Duy Tốn, and brother of songwriter Phạm Duy.

Paris
In Paris at the lycée Louis-le-Grand from 1929 his circle included Léopold Sédar Senghor and Georges Pompidou. He won the Prix Louis Barthou of the Académie française for the autobiographical novel Nam et Sylvie 1942 under the pseudonym Nam Kim, then the Prix Littéraire d'Indochine in 1943 for Légendes des terres sereines He earned his PhD from the University of Toulouse in 1957.

Ambassador
He was briefly ambassador to France for the Ngô Đình Diệm government 1954–1957, but turned down a second appointment as ambassador to UNESCO because of his inability to support Diệm's policies.

Death
He committed suicide on 2 December 1974 at his home in Montreuil-le-Henri, Sarthe. In his youth, he had said "one must justify his existence on this earth" (il faut justifier sa présence sur cette terre).

Works 
 Việt Nam văn phạm (with Trần Trọng Kim, Bùi Kỷ, 1941)
 De Hanoi à la Courtine (1941)
 De la Courtine à Vichy (1942)
 Mélanges (1942)
 Légendes des Terres Sereines (1942)
 La Jeune femme de Nam Xuong (1944)
 Nam et Sylvie (1957)
 La place d'un homme (1958)
 Ma mère

References

Vietnamese writers
1908 births
1974 deaths
Suicides in France